The Alberta Major Soccer League (AMSL) is the highest level of amateur soccer in Alberta. It is roughly level 4 on the Canadian soccer pyramid although levels below 3 are not formally designated by the Canadian Soccer Association.  The champions of the League Cup, renamed the Mike Traficante Challenge Cup in 2008, go on to compete in the national senior men's and women's championships.

Overview
Founded in 1991, the AMSL consists of two divisions, the Men's Division of eight teams and the Women's Division of eight (the Women's Division was added in 1992). Every year since the league's founding, the champions of the league have gone on to compete for the Canadian National Challenge Cup (men) and the Jubilee Shield (women).

The AMSL is operated by the Alberta Soccer Association (ASA), the provincial governing body for soccer in Alberta. This has been at times a problematic arrangement, but it has stood up for the time that the league has been in existence. The various district associations in Calgary, Edmonton, Lethbridge and Red Deer fulfill some of the administrative functions that would normally be handled by such a league, and this has led to rules being interpreted differently for different teams in the same league.  Districts other than Edmonton and Calgary can use their entire men's or woman's league program as "reserve teams". Calgary and Edmonton clubs are expected to field reserve teams in the local tier 1 senior leagues.  The teams to be entered into the AMSL for the following season shall be based on previous season league results and relegation-promotion games, unless accepted as an expansion team. Teams wishing to withdraw or enter the league must notify the ASA in writing before November 15 of each year and attend the fall planning meeting on the last weekend in November.

Challenge Cup & Jubilee Shield

This competition determines the Provincial Champions and traditionally has the top 6 teams from the AMSL Standings competing. There are non-AMSL members who can challenge but this is rare, it designates the Alberta Provincial Champion and Canadian National Challenge Cup representative.
 With 4 of the most populous of the 18 districts having teams in the AMSL; however, the majority of the soccer players in the province are represented.

Teams

Men's division
Calgary Callies
Calgary Dinosaurs
Calgary Villains Elite FC
Cavalry FC U20
Edmonton Drillers
Edmonton Green & Gold
Edmonton Scottish
FC Edmonton U20
Lethbridge FC
St. Albert Impact

Women's division
Calgary Blizzard SC
Calgary Callies
Calgary Foothills WFC
Edmonton Green & Gold
Edmonton Northwest United
Edmonton Scottish Angels
Edmonton Drillers
Lethbridge FC

Year-by-year

Sources:

Note: In 1999 and 2000 the Calgary Callies played as Calgary Celtic SFC.

Men's Titles

Women's Titles

Clubs 
There have been a number of changes with the Alberta Soccer Association and also to the AMSL in 2011.  With the addition of FC Edmonton to the Alberta soccer system their reserve team will be playing an exhibition schedule with 7 of the 8 AMSL teams.

The Calgary Dinosaurs and Edmonton Green and Gold are affiliated with the summer CIS soccer programs for the University of Calgary and University of Alberta respectively. A number of alumni typically play on these teams as well.

Clubs that have competed in the Alberta Major Soccer League

Source and

References

External links
Official website
Official Site
2009 Results
2010 Results

Soccer in Alberta
Canadian National Challenge Cup
Soccer leagues in Canada
Sports leagues established in 1991
1991 establishments in Alberta